Didier Ya Konan (born 22 May 1984) is an Ivorian former footballer who played as a forward for the Ivory Coast national team.

Club career 
Born in Angouakro, Ya Konan started his professional career with ASEC Mimosas in 2003, a club that is known for producing players, such as Kolo Touré and Didier Zokora. He was the top scorer in the African Champions League competition that season, with ASEC eventually failing in the semi finals, to Egyptian club Al Ahly.

In December 2006, he signed for Rosenborg, for a three-year contract in the Norwegian Premier League.

In January 2007, Ya Konan was nominated for the Ivorian Footballer of the Year award for 2006, which was eventually won by Chelsea's striker Didier Drogba. He was one of two homeland-based players at the time to be nominated, the other being former ASEC teammate Bakary Soro.

On 11 August 2009, Ya Konan moved to Bundesliga side Hannover 96, initially signing a three-year contract.

Following the 2013–14 season, he left Germany and completed a move to Al-Ittihad of the Saudi Professional League.

On 27 January 2015, he returned to Hannover 96, where he signed a one-year contract.

On 25 June 2015, Ya Konan signed a two-year deal with Fortuna Düsseldorf.

International career 
Ya Konan was called up to the Ivory Coast national football team for the 2008 African Cup of Nations qualifier against Gabon on 5 October 2006. In March 2007, he was one of four players to receive a late call-up for the Ivorian's African Cup of Nations qualifier against Madagascar in Antananarivo, due to injuries to other members of the squad.

Career statistics 

 All European competition includes: Champions League, Champions League qualifying, Europa League and Europe League qualifying

International goals

Honours

Club
ASEC Mimosas
Côte d'Ivoire Premier Division: 2004, 2005, 2006
Côte d'Ivoire Cup: 2005
Coupe Houphouët-Boigny: 2004, 2006

Rosenborg
Norwegian Premier League Championship: 2009

Ivory Coast
Africa Cup of Nations runner-up:2012

References

External links 
 
 
 
 

Living people
1984 births
Footballers from Abidjan
Association football forwards
Ivorian footballers
Ivory Coast international footballers
Ittihad FC players
Hannover 96 players
Rosenborg BK players
ASEC Mimosas players
Ivorian expatriate footballers
Expatriate footballers in Norway
Expatriate footballers in Germany
Expatriate footballers in Saudi Arabia
Eliteserien players
Ivorian expatriate sportspeople in Germany
Bundesliga players
Ivorian expatriate sportspeople in Norway
2012 Africa Cup of Nations players
2013 Africa Cup of Nations players
2014 FIFA World Cup players
Saudi Professional League players
Ligue 1 (Ivory Coast) players